Wrightson Ltd MREINZ v Clapham is a cited case in New Zealand regarding the common law remedy of rectification.

References

High Court of New Zealand cases
New Zealand contract case law